Miyasaka (written: 宮坂 or 宮阪) is a Japanese surname. Notable people with the surname include:

, Japanese actress, model, dancer and beauty pageant winner
, Japanese manga artist
, Japanese footballer
, Japanese astronomer
, Japanese engineer in electrochemistry

See also
3555 Miyasaka, a main-belt asteroid

Japanese-language surnames